The 2003 Mississippi State Bulldogs football team represented Mississippi State University during the 2003 NCAA Division I-A football season. The team's head coach was Jackie Sherrill, who retired at the end of the season. The Bulldogs played their home games in 2003 at Davis Wade Stadium in Starkville, Mississippi.

Schedule

References

Mississippi State
Mississippi State Bulldogs football seasons
Mississippi State Bulldogs football